A1500 may refer to:
 Amiga 1500 computer
A1500 road, a road in England